Julien Doré (born 7 July 1982) is a French singer-songwriter, musician and actor.

He is the winner of the fifth season of the television show Nouvelle Star, aired on the French Television M6 channel. He is also the great-great-grandson of Gustave Doré, a well-known illustrator of the 19th century.

Life
Doré was born in Alès (Gard, Occitanie), and grew up in Lunel. After taking his baccalauréat littéraire at the college Louis Feuillade, he attended the École des Beaux-Arts of Nîmes for five years. He is the founder of the band Dig up Elvis. In 2006, he created with Guillaume de Molina the project "The Jean d'Ormesson disco suicide", "protean group" which covered pop and disco hits. In June 2007, Doré was voted number one in French Elle Magazine's "15 Sexiest Men" poll. He dated Louise Bourgoin, but the two separated in March 2009.

Nouvelle Star
In 2007, Doré was selected at the casting session in Marseille for the fifth season of the music competition Nouvelle Star, where he presented himself with a ukulele. At the beginning, he only participated in the casting to get free publicity for his band. He convinced the jury when he sang "A la faveur de l'automne" (originally by Tété). His most memorable performances and revelations were while singing "Moi... Lolita" (Alizée) and "...Baby One More Time" (Britney Spears), dance music songs, in acoustics. He won the finale against Tigane.

Career
Doré has had a successful musical career after winning Nouvelle Star with three studio albums, Ersatz (2008), Bichon (2011) and Løve (2013), all reaching top four on the official French Albums Chart. He has also gained chart success in Belgium and Switzerland. 
In 2009, he recorded a duet with Cœur de Pirate of her song, "Pour un infidèle." A video was released to promote the song, showing the two as a 1960s-era celebrity couple. Also in 2009, Doré recorded the song "Helsinki" with French singer Mélanie Pain. Doré also collaborated with French chanteuse Sylvie Vartan on her 2010 album release, Soleil bleu.

He was a guest coach for candidates Quentin Bruno and Law on Season 4 of The Voice: la plus belle voix the French version of the reality television singing competition The Voice.

Discography

Albums
Studio

Live albums

Others
2014: Piano Sølo (limited edition, FR (SNEP): Peak #110)

EPs

Soundtracks
2010: Holiday

DVDs
2015: Løve Live DVD

Singles

*Did not appear in the official Belgian Ultratop 50 charts, but rather in the bubbling under Ultratip charts.

Other songs

Filmography

References

External links

 M6 website
 His band Dig up Elvis
 His band Dig up Elvis (Myspace official page)
 His band Jean d'Ormesson's (Myspace official page

1982 births
Living people
People from Alès
Ukulele players
Nouvelle Star winners
French singer-songwriters
French composers
French male composers
21st-century French male actors
21st-century French singers
21st-century French male singers
French male singer-songwriters